FK Nov Milenium was a football club based in the village Sušica near Strumica, North Macedonia.

History
The club was founded in 1951 as FK Mladost Sušica.

References

External links
Club info at MacedonianFootball 
Football Federation of Macedonia Website 

Defunct football clubs in North Macedonia
Association football clubs established in 1951
Association football clubs disestablished in 2008
1951 establishments in the Socialist Republic of Macedonia
2008 disestablishments in the Republic of Macedonia
Strumica Municipality